Odette is a 1916 Italian silent drama film based upon the play by Victorien Sardou,  directed by Giuseppe de Liguoro, and starring Francesca Bertini, Alfredo De Antoni, and Carlo Benetti. It was remade in 1928 and 1935, with both versions starring Bertini.

The film's sets were designed by the art director Alfredo Manzi.

Cast
 Francesca Bertini as Odette  
 Alfredo De Antoni as André Latour, suo marito 
 Carlo Benetti as L'avventuriero  
 Olga Benetti as Consuelo  
 Guido Brignone 
 Camillo De Riso 
 Sandro Ruffini

References

Bibliography 
 Moliterno, Gino. The A to Z of Italian Cinema. Scarecrow Press, 2009.

External links 
 

1916 films
1916 drama films
Italian drama films
1910s Italian-language films
Italian silent feature films
Italian films based on plays
Films based on works by Victorien Sardou
Films directed by Giuseppe de Liguoro
Italian black-and-white films
Silent drama films